Bastilla flexilinea is a moth of the family Noctuidae first described by Warren in 1915. It is endemic to the Solomon Islands.

References

Bastilla (moth)
Endemic fauna of the Solomon Islands
Moths described in 1915